Giorgadze is a Georgian surname which may refer to:

 Akvsenti Giorgadze (born 1976), Georgian rugby union player
 Andro Giorgadze (born 1996), Georgian football player
 Igor Giorgadze (born 1950), Georgian politician, Minister of State Security of Georgia. Charged with Eduard Shevardnadze's assassination attempt
 Ilia Giorgadze (born 1978), Georgian artistic gymnast
 Grigol Giorgadze (1879–1937), Georgian historian, jurist and politician
 Grigol Giorgadze (Orientalist), Georgian orientalist 
 Tamaz Giorgadze (born 1947) Georgian chess player and chess coach
 Giorgi Giorgadze (born 1964), Georgian chess player
 

Surnames of Georgian origin
Georgian-language surnames
Patronymic surnames
Surnames from given names